Paranormal is an Egyptian supernatural-horror drama streaming television series based on Ahmed Khaled Tawfik's best-selling supernatural book series Ma Waraa Al Tabiaa. The series first premiered on Netflix on November 5, 2020. Paranormal is considered Netflix's first original Egyptian Arabic-language series and the third Middle Eastern Netflix original series following Jinn.

Directed by Amr Salama and joined by Majid Al Ansari, late author Ahmed Khaled Tawfik's book series comes to life in this adaptation, starring Ahmed Amin, Reem Abd El Kader, Samma Ibrahim, Razane Jammal, and Aya Samaha. It seemed as though the show received a lot of turnout on the first days of its release, as it quickly made its way up the ranks to becoming the number one most watched show in the "Top Ten in Egypt Today" list. Paranormal is still ranked as number one in Egypt up until today and was even ranked amongst the top ten most watched shows in several countries around the world. The series managed to become the first Egyptian program to reach Netflix's Worldwide Top 10 charts, peaking at #7 (though it lasted on the top 10 for only 8 days).

Synopsis 
Refaat Ismail is a skeptical Egyptian hematologist at the university of Cairo.  He has a dark sense of humor and considers himself unlucky. In the late 1960s, he meets Maggie, a friend from his youth while he was studying in Scotland. Dr. Refaat encounters a series of supernatural events as he attempts to unravel the mysteries behind each unique and unusual case in a world full of mysterious events that he himself experiences, or ones that are narrated to him. As a counter to his scientific work, Refaat faces local mythology, global folk tales, and his own health issues. Dr. Refaat grows to question his strong scientific convictions after these paranormal experiences, and he and Maggie attempt to save their loved ones.

The first season consists of six standalone episodes, each about a famous urban legend mentioned in the Ma Wara' al-Tabi'a novel series. All are interconnected through a recurring element, the Khadrawy House.  While investigating these mysteries, Refaat coins eponymous laws based on Murphy's law to at first deny the paranormal, then to understand it.

Cast and characters 
 Ahmed Amin as Refaat Ismail, a cynical Egyptian hematologist and professor residing in Cairo. He narrates his experiences with paranormal events that he refuses to believe. Skinny, bald and suffers various health issues.
 Reem Abd El Kader as Shiraz Elkhadrawy, the girl Refaat loved during his childhood, only to discover that she was a ghost. She stalks his old friends and their families to lead him to what she wants.
 Samma Ibrahim as Raeefa Ismail, Refaat's older sister and Talaat's wife.
 Razane Jammal as Maggie Mckillop, Refaat's university colleague from Scotland, whom he happens to still have feelings for. She comes back to Egypt for a visit.
 Aya Samaha as Huwaida Abdel Moniem, Refaat's fiancée. Refaat is at first too timid to break up with her but does so after saving her from a mummy's curse.
 Rushdi Al Shami as Reda Ismail, Refaat's older brother.
 Batea Khalil as Talaat, Raeefa's husband.
 Abdelsamee Abdallah as Kamal
 Adam Wahdan as Taha
 Fatima AlBanawi as Nargis
 Heba El Dessouky as Tayseer, Samah, the Naiad

Development 
News of Paranormal first came to light in the summer of 2020. The Paranormal series is the best-selling series of fictional books in the Arab world, with more than 15 million copies sold by the author Ahmed Khaled Tawfik. Paranormal is Netflix's first foray into Egyptian drama. Being brought to life and produced by both Mohamed Hefzy and Amr Salama."Staying true to the books, Paranormal, filmed in Egypt will see an all-Egyptian crew, that will reflects Netflix's commitment to creating authentic Egyptian content for global audiences to enjoy. The series will also bring to life the supernatural, using powerful post production and visual effects (VFX) techniques to complement cast performances." - Amr Salama, producer and director.Egyptian actor and writer Ahmed Amin plays the lead role of Refaat Ismail."Put simply, Dr. Refaat Ismail is an anti-hero. An ordinary and frail man, he resonated with readers because he was unlike the usual trope of a hero in Arabic literature. “He doesn’t have any typical hero characteristics,” explains Amin. "He has a dark sense of humour, is very sarcastic and, ultimately, is very lonely person. He would never consider himself a hero, and – most importantly – doesn’t consider himself a believer in the paranormal." - Ahmed Amin, lead role.

Episodes

Season 1

Release date
Paranormal was released on 5 November 2020 on Netflix.

Reception 
Den of Geek praised Ahmed Amin's performance and said that he is "never less than completely watchable", though the show is occasionally hokey.

References

External links
 
 

Arabic-language Netflix original programming
Egyptian drama television series
2020s horror television series
Mystery television series
Fantasy television series
Television series set in the 1960s
2020 Egyptian television series debuts
2020s Egyptian television series
2020s supernatural television series
Egyptian fantasy television series